Niklas Klingberg (born 6 February 1973) is a former Swedish motorcycle speedway rider from Sweden, who was a member of Sweden team at Speedway World Cups. He was Swedish Champion in 2002.

Career details

World Championships 
 Individual World Championship and Speedway Grand Prix
 2001 - 10th place (54 pts)
 2002 - 18th place (37 pts)
 Team World Championship (Speedway World Team Cup and Speedway World Cup)
 1996 - 5th place - (14pts)
 2001 -  Wrocław - 3rd place (10 pts)
 2002 -  Peterborough - 3rd place (10 pts)
 Individual U-21 World Championship
 1991 -  Coventry - 7th place (8 pts)
 1992 -  Pfaffenhofen - 7th place (9 pts)
 1993 -  Pardubice - 11th place (7 pts)

European Championships 
 Individual European Championship
 2004 -  Holsted - 9th place (6 pts)

Family
His father Börje Klingberg is also a former Swedish international speedway rider.

See also 
 Sweden national speedway team
 List of Speedway Grand Prix riders

References

External links 
 (pl) Klingberg at www.GTZ.Grudziadz.net

1973 births
Living people
Swedish speedway riders
Oxford Cheetahs riders